"Things" is a song which was written and recorded by Bobby Darin in 1962. Released as a single, it reached No.3 in the U.S.and Canada, No.2 in the U.K., and No.3 in the first-ever official Irish Singles Chart, published by RTÉ in October 1962. It was later covered by Ronnie Dove and became a Top 30 country hit for him.

In 1962, Darin began to write and sing country music, with hit songs including "Things". It was the final Darin single released on the Atco Records unit of Atlantic Records before he began recording for Capitol Records. While vault material would continue to be issued on Atco, Darin would later return to Atlantic Records.

Darin's next hits after "Things" were "You're the Reason I'm Living" (U.S. No.3), and "18 Yellow Roses" (U.S. No.10) on Capitol Records, which Darin joined in 1962 (he returned to Atlantic four years later).

Chart history

Weekly charts

Year-end charts

Ronnie Dove version

In 1975, pop and country singer Ronnie Dove recorded the song for Melodyland Records, Motown’s country label. His version reached #25 on the country chart that year, and became Ronnie’s highest charting country hit. It was released on an album called “New Old-Fashioned Love” in 1977, which was released on M.C. Records only as a promotional album sent to radio stations.

Other versions
The song was sung as a duet by Dean Martin and Nancy Sinatra in the 1967 TV special Movin' with Nancy, starring Nancy Sinatra. The TV special was released to home video in the U.S. in 2000.

Italian singer Remo Germani made a cover in 1962 called "Baci".

A cover of the song by Anne Murray from her 1976 album Keeping in Touch peaked at No. 12 on the US adult contemporary chart and No. 22 Country.

Jerry Lee Lewis covered the song on his 1995 album Young Blood.

Singer Robbie Williams recorded a version of "Things", with Jane Horrocks, for his 2001 swing album Swing When You're Winning.
British rock n roll revivalist band Showaddywaddy covered the song on their 1983 album Living Legends with Bill “Buddy” Gask on lead vocals. 
Phantom of the Opera film actress Emmy Rossum did a cover of "Things" on her 2013 album Sentimental Journey, which peaked at 92 on the U.S. Billboard 200 chart.

Notes

1962 songs
1962 singles
1976 singles
Songs written by Bobby Darin
Bobby Darin songs
Dean Martin songs
Nancy Sinatra songs
Anne Murray songs
Song recordings produced by Ahmet Ertegun
Atco Records singles
Reprise Records singles
Capitol Records singles